Koruklu can refer to:

 Körüklü, Karaisalı
 Koruklu, Keşan